Prophets is a genus of herbaceous, perennial and bulbous plants in the family Amaryllidaceae, subfamily Amaryllidoideae. It includes 5 accepted species that are native to Southeast Asia, Papuasia, and Australia.

Species

Proiphys alba (R.Br.)Mabb. - New Guinea, Qld, NT, WA
Proiphys amboinensis  (L.) Herb. - Thailand, Philippines, Sulawesi, Lesser Sunda Islands, Papuasia, Qld, WA; known as "Cardwell Lily"
Proiphys cunninghamii  (Aiton ex Lindl.) Mabb.  - Qld, NSW; known as "Brisbane Lily" or "Moreton Bay Lily"
Proiphys infundibularis  D.L.Jones & Dowe - Qld
Proiphys kimberleyensis  M.D.Barrett & R.L.Barrett - Northwestern Australia

Uses
Their flowers and leaves make them desirable garden subjects, but they are not widely cultivated as ornamental plants.

References

Amaryllidaceae genera
Amaryllidoideae